Kirsten Borgen (born 16 November 1957)  is a Norwegian sport wrestler. She was born in Kirkenes.

She won a silver medal at the 1989 World Wrestling Championships. In 1988 she won a silver medal at the European Wrestling Championships.

References

1957 births
Living people
People from Sør-Varanger
Norwegian female sport wrestlers
World Wrestling Championships medalists
Sportspeople from Troms og Finnmark
20th-century Norwegian women
21st-century Norwegian women